Anna Bernholm (born 5 March 1991) is a Swedish judoka. In 2021, she competed in the women's 70 kg event at the 2020 Summer Olympics in Tokyo, Japan.

She is the gold medalist of the 2017 Judo Grand Slam Abu Dhabi in the -70 kg category.

References

External links
 
 
 

1991 births
Living people
Swedish female judoka
Judoka at the 2015 European Games
Judoka at the 2019 European Games
European Games medalists in judo
European Games bronze medalists for Sweden
Judoka at the 2020 Summer Olympics
Olympic judoka of Sweden
20th-century Swedish women
21st-century Swedish women